Khoveyseh may refer to:
 Khoveyseh, Karun
 Khoveyseh, Ramshir

See also
Khoveysh